Laureana di Borrello is a comune (municipality) in the Metropolitan City of Reggio Calabria in the Italian region of Calabria, located about  southwest of Catanzaro and about  northeast of Reggio Calabria.

Geography
Laureana di Borrello borders the following municipalities: Candidoni, Serrata, San Pietro di Caridà, Feroleto della Chiesa, Galatro, Rosarno, San Calogero.

Laureana di Borrello includes the villages of Bellantone, Case sparse, Sant'Anna, and Stelletanone.

Demographics 
This table depicts the population of the municipality.

References

External links

 Website on Laureana traditions and history

Cities and towns in Calabria